The 48th Primetime Emmy Awards were held at the Pasadena Civic Auditorium in Pasadena, California. The awards were presented over two ceremonies, one untelevised on September 7, 1996, and other televised on September 8, 1996. It was hosted by Michael J. Fox, Paul Reiser, and Oprah Winfrey. Two networks, A&E and AMC, received their first major nominations this year.

Frasier took home Outstanding Comedy Series for the third straight year, and won two major awards overall. In the drama field, ER came into the ceremony as the most nominated drama for the second straight year with eleven major nominations, it defeated defending champion NYPD Blue to win Outstanding Drama Series. This turned out to be the only major award ER won. No show won more than two major awards.

The HBO comedy The Larry Sanders Show made Emmy history when it became the first show outside the Big Three television networks to receive the most major nominations (12). Furthermore, Rip Torn won the Supporting Comedy actor award, the first for HBO.

Another first came with Amanda Plummer for Showtime's The Outer Limits. Not only was it the first time a cable network won in her category (Guest Actress, Drama) but was Showtime's first ever Acting Emmy win.

For the twelfth and final season of Murder, She Wrote, Angela Lansbury was once again nominated for Outstanding Lead Actress in a Drama Series, she had been nominated for every season of the show, but she was defeated once again. In the process she set records for being the most nominated actress in the category (18), as well as the most nominated actress without winning. Both of these records still stand.

Winners and nominees

Programs

Acting

Lead performances

Supporting performances

Guest performances

Directing

Writing

Most major nominations
By network 
 NBC – 45
 HBO – 35
 CBS – 27
 ABC – 19

By program
 The Larry Sanders Show (HBO) – 12
 ER (NBC) – 11
 Chicago Hope (CBS) / NYPD Blue (ABC) / Seinfeld (NBC) – 8
 Frasier (NBC) – 7

Most major awards
By network 
 NBC – 10
 CBS / HBO – 6
 ABC / Fox / TNT – 2

By program
 Dennis Miller Live (HBO) / Frasier (NBC) / Gulliver's Travels (NBC) / The Kennedy Center Honors (CBS)   Picket Fences (CBS) / Rasputin: Dark Servant of Destiny (HBO) / The X-Files (Fox) – 2

Notes

In Memoriam

 Martin Balsam
 Erma Bombeck
 George Burns
 John Chancellor
 Vince Edwards
 Herb Edelman
 Ella Fitzgerald
 Gene Kelly
 Dean Martin
 Audrey Meadows
 Greg Morris
 David Opatoshu
 McLean Stevenson
 Jack Weston

References

External links
 Emmys.com list of 1996 Nominees & Winners
 

048
Primetime Emmy Awards
September 1996 events in the United States
Events in Pasadena, California
1996 in California
20th century in Pasadena, California